Varangeh Rud (also Romanized as Vārangeh Rūd; also known as Vārang Rūd) is a village in Nesa Rural District, Asara District, Karaj County, Alborz Province, Iran. At the 2006 census, its population was 264, in 70 families.

References 

Populated places in Karaj County